John Ewing may refer to:

People
 John Ewing (pastor) (1732–1802), Presbyterian pastor and university president
 John Ewing (baseball) (1863–1895), professional baseball player
 John Ewing (Indiana politician) (1789–1858), U.S. Representative from Indiana
 John Ewing (diplomat) (1857–1923), U.S. Minister to Honduras, 1913–1918
 John Ewing (Australian politician) (1863–1933), Australian politician, member of the WA Legislative Assembly
 John D. Ewing (1892–1952), Louisiana journalist; editor, publisher of Shreveport Times, Monroe New-Star-World
 John H. Ewing (1918–2012), member of the New Jersey General Assembly and State Senate
 John Hoge Ewing (1796–1887), U.S. Representative from Pennsylvania.
 John Ewing (Nebraska politician), treasurer of Douglas County, Nebraska
 John Ewing (goldminer) (1844–1922), New Zealand goldminer
 John C. Ewing (1843–1918), American soldier
 John T. Ewing (1856–1926), American educator, university administrator, and college football coach
 John "Streamline" Ewing (1917–2002), American jazz trombonist

Fictional characters
 J. R. Ewing, fictional character; main villain on U.S. television series Dallas
 Jock Ewing (John Ross Ewing Sr.), fictional character; father of J. R. Ewing on U.S. television series Dallas
 John Ross Ewing III, fictional character; son of J. R. Ewing on U.S. television series Dallas